The Canadian Pacific Railway Upper Lake Service, also known as the Canadian Pacific Railway Upper Lake Steamships, was a division of Canadian Pacific Railway (CPR), which began operating passenger and cargo shipping routes in the Great Lakes during the late 19th century.

CPR overview
In 1884, CPR began purchasing sailing ships as part of a railway supply service on the Great Lakes. Over time, CPR became a railroad company with widely organized water transportation auxiliaries including the CPR Upper Lake Service, the trans-Pacific service, the British Columbia Coast Steamships, the British Columbia Lake and River Service, the trans-Atlantic service, and the Ferry service.  In the 20th century, the company evolved into a transcontinental railroad which operated two transoceanic services which connected Canada with Europe and with Asia. The range of CPR services were aspects of an integrated plan. The service was ended in 1965.

Canadian Pacific Railway Upper Lake Steamships
CPR's investment in the Great Lakes produced expanded routes and schedules. The inland waters fleet and personnel increased.  The decision to expand produced an infrastructure building program. The evolution of the upper lakes service was integrated into CPR's rail service network with trans-Pacific connections.

Inland fleet

See also
 CP Ships

Notes

References
 Musk, George. (1981).  Canadian Pacific: The Story of the Famous Shipping Line.  Toronto: Holt, Rinehart and Winston of Canada. ;  OCLC 7540915

External links
Keewatin Maritime Museum
 Film "Bring Her on Home"
 "Canadian Pacific Railway, Great Lakes Steamships," by R.L.Kennedy
 "CP Ships – Canadian Pacific – Posters and Ads"

Canadian Pacific Railway